Boyelles is a commune in the Pas-de-Calais department in the Hauts-de-France region in northern France.

Geography
A farming village located 6 miles (11 km) south of Arras on the N17 road.
A celebration of the potato takes place annually on the 1st Sunday in September.

Population

Sights
 The church of St. Leger, dating from the twentieth century.
 The Commonwealth War Graves Commission cemetery.

See also
Communes of the Pas-de-Calais department

References

External links

 The CWGC cemetery

Communes of Pas-de-Calais